The Zimbabwe government consists of an elected head of state, the president, and a legislature. The presidential term lasts for 5 years, and is elected by majority, with a second round if no candidate receives a majority in the first round. The Parliament is bicameral, consisting of the House of Assembly and Senate. Following the 2013 constitution, the House of Assembly has 270 members. 210 are elected for five-year terms by single-member constituencies. Furthermore, the constitution specifies that for the two first parliaments, there are 60 additional seats reserved for women, 6 seats per province, which are filled based on the votes for in the single-member constituencies, using party-list proportional representation, distributed using the largest remainder method and the hare quota. The Senate has 80 members: 60 are elected for five-year terms in 6-member constituencies representing one of the 10 provinces, elected based on the votes in the lower house election, using party-list proportional representation, distributed using the hare quota. Additionally the senate consists of 2 seats for each non-metropolitan district of Zimbabwe elected by each provincial assembly of chiefs using SNTV, 1 seat each for the president and deputy president of the National Council of Chiefs and 1 male and 1 female seat for people with disabilities elected on separate ballots using FPTP by an electoral college designated by the National Disability Board.

Zimbabwe is a one party dominant state; the dominant party being the Zimbabwe African National Union - Patriotic Front. Opposition parties are permitted, including the MDC Alliance led by Nelson Chamisa and the MDC–T led by Thokozani Khuphe, both formations of the original Movement for Democratic Change created in 1999. Recent elections (March 2008) have witnessed former ruling party finance minister Simba Makoni standing as an independent presidential candidate.

Latest elections

President

House of Assembly

Senate

Referendums
On 12–13 February 2000, there was a constitutional referendum for increasing the powers of the president. These powers were to permit the government to confiscate White-owned land without compensation for the purpose of redistribution to Black farmers, and to give government officials immunity from prosecution.

 "Yes" Votes 45.32%
 "No" Votes 54.68%

See also
List of Zimbabwean presidential election results by province
Electoral calendar
 Electoral system

References

External links
"Zimbabwe Election: Stolen Ballots" GuardianFilms
Electionworld
African Elections Database
Adam Carr's Election Archive